Arthur Allen (by 1509 – 1557/58), of Wantage, Berkshire, was an English politician.

He was a Member (MP) of the Parliament of England for Ludgershall in November 1554.

References

1558 deaths
People from Wantage
English MPs 1554–1555
Year of birth uncertain